Arkansas is a 2018 Americana album by John Oates, who is best known as being part of the rock and soul duo Hall & Oates. The album was originally released on January 26, 2018. It was recorded with a group of Nashville session musicians called the Good Road Band.

The album originally began as a tribute to Oates' idol, American country blues singer and guitarist Mississippi John Hurt. Alongside two new songs by Oates, many of the songs are re-imagined traditional Delta, country blues and ragtime selections, such as Emmett Miller's “Anytime” and Jimmie Rodgers' “Miss the Mississippi and You”.

Oates is New York City-born and Philadelphia-raised, but has a deep connection to the Arkansas region. Oates explained to Billboard Magazine, "My uncle Tony, after World War II, moved to Fayetteville, Arkansas and lived there for the rest of his life. I went there to visit him. I stood at night out in the middle of the cotton fields all along the banks of the Mississippi River and it was one of the most beautiful moments that I've ever experienced, with the moonlight shining on the white cotton, and I just thought, 'Man, this is so American, in a way.'"

Track listing
 "Anytime" (Herbert Lawson/Traditional) – 3:07
 "Arkansas" (Oates) – 4:21
 "My Creole Belle" (Mississippi John Hurt) – 2:16
 "Pallet Soft and Low" (Traditional) – 6:05
 "Miss the Mississippi and You" (William Heagney) – 3:34
 "Stack O Lee" (Traditional) – 2:49
 "That'll Never Happen No More" (Blind Blake/Traditional) – 3:07
 "Dig Back Deep" (Oates) – 3:55
 "Lord Send Me" (Traditional) – 2:39
 "Spike Driver Blues" (Hurt) – 2:09

Personnel
On the sleeve, the album is credited to "John Oates with the Good Road Band".
Lead vocals, acoustic guitar: John Oates
Mandolin: Sam Bush
Pedal steel guitar: Russ Pahl
Electric guitar: Guthrie Trapp
Bass guitar: Steve Mackey
Cello:  Nathaniel Smith
Drums, percussion: Josh Day

References

2018 albums
John Oates albums